Jesse Winter Whatley (20 January 1895 – 19 March 1982) was an association footballer who spent his entire professional career at Bristol Rovers.

Known as "Gentleman Jess" through his footballing career, Whatley started playing competitive football in the British Army and represented an Egyptian Army XI in games against Belgium and France. While in the Army he served in the 1st and 3rd Battalions of the Wiltshire Regiment during World War I. Following the war he joined Trowbridge Town in August 1919, and after just two months playing in the Wiltshire League he was snapped up by Southern League side Bristol Rovers.

Despite conceding five goals to Norwich City on his Rovers debut he went on to become a first team regular for The Pirates, playing in 246 consecutive League games between August 1922 and April 1928, a Football League record for most consecutive games that stood until 1953. By the time he retired from professional football in 1930 he had played 386 League games for Rovers; 14 in the Southern League and 372 in the Football League. He continued playing non-League football in Bristol for a further two years, for Stapleton Institute and Mental Institution Club, later moving into coaching, becoming coach of Fry's Cocoa Tree Boys in 1937. In 1939 he was appointed as manager of Downend Football Club, and two years later he took charge of Soundwell.

Following the end of his playing days he worked on a farm in Westerleigh, Gloucestershire.

Career statistics
The table below shows Whatley's league appearances in each season. Cup games are not counted here.

Sources

1895 births
1982 deaths
People from Trowbridge
English footballers
Association football goalkeepers
English Football League players
Trowbridge Town F.C. players
Bristol Rovers F.C. players
Wiltshire Regiment soldiers
People from Westerleigh
British Army personnel of World War I
Military personnel from Wiltshire